Clastoptera obtusa, the alder spittlebug, is a species of spittlebug in the family Clastopteridae. It is found in North America.

Subspecies
These three subspecies belong to the species Clastoptera obtusa:
 Clastoptera obtusa borealis Ball
 Clastoptera obtusa obtusa
 Clastoptera obtusa pallida Ball

References

External links

 

Articles created by Qbugbot
Insects described in 1825
Clastopteridae